The 2009 NHL Entry Draft was the 47th Entry Draft. It was held on June 26–27, 2009, at the Bell Centre in Montreal, Quebec. The Draft was part of the Montreal Canadiens' centennial celebrations. National Hockey League teams took turns selecting amateur ice hockey players from junior, collegiate, or European leagues. The New York Islanders, who finished last overall in the 2008–09 NHL season, retained the first overall selection following that year's NHL Draft lottery.

The New York Islanders used the first overall pick to select center John Tavares from the London Knights of the Ontario Hockey League (OHL). The Tampa Bay Lightning used the second pick to draft defenceman Victor Hedman from Modo Hockey of the SEL, and the Colorado Avalanche drafted Matt Duchene of the Brampton Battalion with the third overall pick. Seven Swedes were selected in the first round, an all-time record for the country.

Top prospects 
Source: NHL Central Scouting Bureau Final Rankings.

Selections by round

Round one

Notes
 The Minnesota Wild's first-round pick went to the New York Islanders as the result of a trade on June 26, 2009 that sent Columbus' first and third-round picks both in 2009 (16th and 77th overall) and a seventh-round pick in 2009 (182nd overall) to Minnesota in exchange for this pick.
 The Columbus Blue Jackets' first-round pick went to the Minnesota Wild as the result of a trade on June 26, 2009 that sent Minnesota's first-round pick (12th overall) to the New York Islanders in exchange for Columbus' third-round pick in 2009 (77th overall), a seventh-round pick in 2009 (182nd overall) and this pick.
New York previously acquired this pick as the result of a trade on June 26, 2009 that sent San Jose's first-round pick in 2009 (26th overall), Toronto's second-round pick in 2009 (37th overall), and a third and fourth-round pick both in 2009 (62nd and 92nd overall) to Columbus in exchange for a third-round pick in 2009 (77th overall) and this pick.
 The Calgary Flames' first-round pick went to the New Jersey Devils as the result of a trade on June 26, 2009 that sent a first and third-round pick both in 2009 (23rd and 84th overall) to Calgary in exchange for this pick.
 The Philadelphia Flyers' first-round pick went to the Columbus Blue Jackets as the result of a trade on June 26, 2009 that sent San Jose's first-round pick in 2009 (26th overall) and Toronto's second-round pick in 2009 (37th overall) to Anaheim in exchange for this pick.
Anaheim previously acquired this pick as the result of a trade on June 26, 2009 that sent Chris Pronger and Ryan Dingle to Philadelphia in exchange for Joffrey Lupul, Luca Sbisa, a first-round pick in 2010, a conditional third-round pick in 2010 or 2011, and this pick.
 The New Jersey Devils' first-round pick went to the Calgary Flames as the result of a trade on June 26, 2009 that sent a first-round pick in 2009 (20th overall) to New Jersey in exchange for a third-round pick in 2009 (84th overall) and this pick.
 The San Jose Sharks' first-round pick went to the Anaheim Ducks as the result of a trade on June 26, 2009 that sent Philadelphia's first-round pick in 2009 (21st overall) to Columbus in exchange for Toronto's second-round pick in 2009 (37th overall) and this pick.
Columbus previously acquired this pick as the result of a trade on June 26, 2009 that sent a first and third-round pick both in 2009 (16th and 77th overall) to the New York Islanders in exchange for Toronto's second-round pick in 2009 (37th overall), and a third and fourth-round pick both in 2009 (62nd and 92nd overall) and this pick.
New York previously acquired this pick as the result of a trade on February 20, 2009 that sent Mike Comrie and Chris Campoli to Ottawa in exchange for Dean McAmmond and this pick.
Ottawa previously acquired this pick as the result of a trade on August 29, 2008 that sent Andrej Meszaros to Tampa Bay in exchange for Filip Kuba, Alexandre Picard and this pick.
Tampa Bay previously acquired this pick as the result of a trade on July 4, 2008 that sent Dan Boyle and Brad Lukowich to San Jose in exchange for Matt Carle, Ty Wishart, a fourth-round pick in 2010 and this pick.
 The Detroit Red Wings' first-round pick went to the Tampa Bay Lightning as the result of a trade on June 26, 2009 that sent a second-round pick in 2009 (32nd overall) and Florida's third-round pick in 2009 (75th overall) to Detroit in exchange for this pick.

Round two

Notes
 The Tampa Bay Lightning's second-round pick went to the Detroit Red Wings as the result of a trade on June 26, 2009 that sent a first-round pick in 2009 (29th overall) to Tampa Bay in exchange for Florida's third-round pick in 2009 (75th overall) and this pick.
 The Toronto Maple Leafs' second-round pick went to the Anaheim Ducks as the result of a trade on June 26, 2009 that sent Philadelphia's first-round pick in 2009 (21st overall) to Columbus in exchange for San Jose's first-round pick in 2009 (26th overall) and this pick.
Columbus previously acquired this pick as the result of a trade on June 26, 2009 that sent a first and third-round pick both in 2009 (16th and 77th overall) to the New York Islanders in exchange for San Jose's first-round pick in 2009 (26th overall), a third and fourth-round pick both in 2009 (62nd and 92nd overall) and this pick.
New York previously acquired this pick as the result of a trade on June 20, 2008 that sent a first-round pick in 2008 to Toronto in exchange for a first-round pick in 2008, a third-round pick in 2008 and this pick.
 The Minnesota Wild's second-round pick went to the Nashville Predators as the result of a trade on July 1, 2008 that sent Marek Zidlicky to Minnesota in exchange for Ryan Jones and this pick.
 The Buffalo Sabres' second-round pick went to the San Jose Sharks as the result of a trade on July 4, 2008 that sent Craig Rivet and a seventh-round pick in 2010 to Buffalo in exchange for a second-round pick in 2010 and this pick.
 The Anaheim Ducks' second-round pick went to the Atlanta Thrashers as the result of a trade on February 16, 2009 that sent Mathieu Schneider and a conditional third-round pick in 2009 to Montreal in exchange for a third-round pick in 2010 and this pick.
Montreal previously acquired this pick in a trade on February 26, 2008 that sent Cristobal Huet to Washington in exchange for this pick.
Washington previously acquired this pick in a trade on November 19, 2007 that sent Brian Sutherby to Anaheim in exchange for this pick.
 The Columbus Blue Jackets' second-round pick went to the Ottawa Senators as the result of a trade on March 4, 2009 that sent Antoine Vermette to Columbus in exchange for Pascal Leclaire and this pick.
 The New York Rangers were awarded the seventeenth pick in the second-round on March 11, 2009 for deceased player Alexei Cherepanov.
 The Montreal Canadiens' second-round pick went to the Colorado Avalanche as the result of a trade on March 4, 2009 that sent Jordan Leopold to Calgary in exchange for Lawrence Nycholat, Ryan Wilson and this pick.
Calgary previously acquired this pick as the result of a trade on June 20, 2008 that sent Alex Tanguay and a fifth-round pick in 2008 to Montreal in exchange for a first-round pick in 2008 and this pick.
 The New York Rangers' second-round pick went to the Toronto Maple Leafs as a result of a trade on March 4, 2009 that sent Nik Antropov to New York in exchange for a conditional fourth-round pick in 2010 and this pick.
 The Calgary Flames' second-round pick went to the Carolina Hurricanes as the result of a trade on March 4, 2009 that sent Justin Williams to Los Angeles in exchange for Patrick O'Sullivan and this pick.
Los Angeles previously acquired this pick as the result of a trade on June 20, 2008 that sent Michael Cammalleri and a second-round pick in 2008 to Calgary in exchange for a first-round pick in 2008 and this pick.
 The Philadelphia Flyers' second-round pick went to the Tampa Bay Lightning as the result of a trade on February 25, 2008 that sent Vaclav Prospal to Philadelphia in exchange for Alexandre Picard and this pick (being conditional at the time of the trade). The condition – Tampa Bay will receive a second-round pick in 2009 if the Flyers qualify for the 2008 Eastern Conference Final – was converted on May 3, 2008.
 The Boston Bruins' second-round pick went to the Columbus Blue Jackets as the result of a trade on June 27, 2009 that sent a third and fourth-round pick both in 2009 (62nd and 92nd overall) to the New York Islanders in exchange for this pick.
New York previously acquired this pick as the result of a trade on September 11, 2007 that sent Petteri Nokelainen to Boston in exchange for Ben Walter and this pick (being conditional at the time of the trade). The condition – if Nokelainen plays in 50 or more games in either 2007–08 or 2008–09 OR appears in 90 games total over those seasons – was converted on March 22, 2008.
 The Carolina Hurricanes' second-round pick went to the Toronto Maple Leafs as the result of a trade on March 4, 2009 that sent Dominic Moore to Buffalo in exchange for this pick.
Buffalo previously acquired this pick as the result of a trade on March 4, 2009 that sent Ales Kotalik to Edmonton in exchange for this pick.
Edmonton previously acquired this pick as the result of a trade on March 4, 2009 that sent Erik Cole and a fifth-round pick in 2009 to Carolina in exchange for Patrick O'Sullivan and this pick.

Round three

Notes

 The New York Islanders' third-round pick was re-acquired as the result of a trade on June 27, 2009, that sent Boston's second-round pick in 2009 (56th overall) to Columbus in exchange for a fourth-round pick in 2009 (92nd overall) and this pick.
Columbus previously acquired this pick as the result of a trade on June 26, 2009, that sent a first and third-round pick both in 2009 (16th and 77th overall) to New York in exchange for San Jose's first-round pick, Toronto's second-round pick, a fourth-round pick all in 2009 (26th, 37th and 92nd overall) and this pick.
 The Tampa Bay Lightning's third-round pick went to the Pittsburgh Penguins as the result of a trade on June 28, 2008, that sent Gary Roberts and Ryan Malone to Tampa Bay in exchange for this pick (being conditional at the time of the trade). The condition – Ryan Malone is signed by Tampa Bay prior to the 2008–09 season – was converted on June 30, 2008.
 The Atlanta Thrashers' third-round pick went to the Montreal Canadiens as the result of a trade on February 17, 2009, that sent Anaheim's second-round pick in 2009 and a third-round pick in 2010 to Atlanta in exchange for Mathieu Schneider and this pick (being conditional at the time of the trade). The condition – Montreal will receive a third-round pick in 2009 if they are eliminated in the Conference Quarterfinals of the 2009 Stanley Cup playoffs – was converted on April 22, 2009.
 The Los Angeles Kings' third-round pick went to the Buffalo Sabres as the result of a trade on July 4, 2008, that sent Steve Bernier to Vancouver in exchange for a second-round pick in 2010 and this pick.
Vancouver previously acquired this pick as the result of a trade on July 5, 2006, that sent Dan Cloutier to Los Angeles for a second-round pick in 2007 and this pick (being conditional at time of trade). The condition – Cloutier resigning with the Los Angeles Kings – was converted on September 27, 2006.
 The Phoenix Coyotes' third-round pick went to the Florida Panthers as the result of a trade on June 27, 2009, that sent Jay Bouwmeester to Calgary in exchange for Jordan Leopold and this pick.
Calgary previously acquired this pick as the result of a trade on March 4, 2009, that sent Matthew Lombardi, Brandon Prust and a conditional first-round pick in either 2009 or 2010 to Phoenix in exchange for Olli Jokinen and this pick.
 The Ottawa Senators' third-round pick went to the Nashville Predators as the result of a trade on June 20, 2008, that sent a first-round pick in 2008 to Ottawa in exchange for a first-round pick in 2008 and this pick.
 The Minnesota Wild's third-round pick went to the New Jersey Devils as the result of a trade on June 20, 2008, that sent a first-round pick in 2008 to Minnesota in exchange for a first-round pick in 2008 and this pick.
 The Buffalo Sabres' third-round pick went to the Calgary Flames as the result of a trade on June 27, 2009, that sent New Jersey's third-round pick and Columbus' fourth-round pick both in 2009 (84th and 107th overall) to Los Angeles in exchange for this pick.
Los Angeles previously acquired this pick as the result of a trade on June 20, 2008, that sent a first-round pick in 2008 to Buffalo in exchange for a first-round pick in 2008 and this pick.
 The Florida Panthers' third-round pick went to the Detroit Red Wings as the result of a trade on June 26, 2009, that sent a first-round pick in 2009 (29th overall) to Tampa Bay in exchange for a second-round pick in 2009 (32nd overall) and this pick.
Tampa Bay previously acquired this pick as the result of a trade on March 4, 2009, that sent Steve Eminger to Florida in exchange for Noah Welch and this pick.
 The Columbus Blue Jackets' third-round pick went to the Minnesota Wild as the result of a trade on June 26, 2009, that sent a first-round pick in 2009 (12th overall) to the New York Islanders in exchange for Columbus' first-round pick in 2009 (16th overall), a seventh-round pick in 2009 (182nd overall) and this pick.
New York previously acquired this pick as the result of a trade on June 26, 2009, that sent San Jose's first-round pick, Toronto's second-round pick, a third-round pick and a fourth-round pick all in 2009 (26th, 37th, 62nd and 92nd overall) to Columbus in exchange for a first-round pick in 2009 (16th overall) and this pick.
 The Calgary Flames' third-round pick went to the Philadelphia Flyers as the result of a trade on February 20, 2008, that sent Jim Vandermeer to Calgary in exchange for this pick.
 The Philadelphia Flyers' third-round pick went to the Edmonton Oilers as the result of a trade on July 1, 2007, that sent Joffrey Lupul and Jason Smith to Philadelphia in exchange for Joni Pitkanen and Geoff Sanderson and this pick.
 The New Jersey Devils' third-round pick went to the Los Angeles Kings as the result of a trade on June 27, 2009, that sent a third-round pick in 2009 (74th overall) to Calgary in exchange for a fourth-round pick in 2009 (107th overall) and this pick.
Calgary previously acquired this pick as the result of a trade on June 26, 2009, that sent a first-round pick in 2009 (20th overall) to New Jersey in exchange for a first-round pick in 2009 (23rd overall) and this pick.
 The San Jose Sharks' third-round pick went to the Philadelphia Flyers as the result of a trade on November 7, 2008, that sent Steve Downie, Steve Eminger, and Tampa Bay's fourth-round pick in 2009 to Tampa Bay in exchange for Matt Carle and this pick.
Tampa Bay previously acquired this pick as the result of a trade on June 21, 2008, that sent a third-round pick in 2008 to San Jose in exchange for a fourth-round pick in 2008, a fifth-round pick in 2008 and this pick.
 The Pittsburgh Penguins' third-round pick went to the Phoenix Coyotes as the result of a trade on June 27, 2009, that sent a third-round pick in 2010 to the New York Islanders in exchange for this pick.
New York previously acquired this pick as the result of a trade on March 4, 2009, that sent Bill Guerin to Pittsburgh in exchange for this pick (being conditional at the time of the trade). The conditions – Pittsburgh advance past the first round of the 2009 Stanley Cup playoffs and Guerin plays in more than 50% of those First round games – were converted on April 21 and 25, 2009, respectively.

Round four

Notes (Round four)

 The New York Islanders' fourth-round pick temporarily went to the Columbus Blue Jackets as the result of a trade on June 26, 2009, that sent a first-round pick (#16 overall) in 2009 and a third-round pick (#77 overall) in 2009 to the New York Islanders in exchange for a first-round pick (#26 overall) in 2009, a second-round pick (#37 overall) in 2009, a third-round pick (#62 overall) in 2009 and this pick.
New York re-acquired the pick as the result of a trade on June 27, 2009, that sent a second-round pick (#56 overall) in 2009 to Columbus in exchange for a fourth-round pick (#92 overall) in 2009 and this pick.
 The Tampa Bay Lightning's fourth-round pick temporarily went to the Philadelphia Flyers as the result of a trade on June 18, 2008, that sent Vaclav Prospal to Tampa Bay in exchange for Nashville's seventh-round pick in 2008 and this pick (being conditional at the time of the trade). The condition – Vaclav Prospal is signed by Tampa Bay prior to the 2008–09 season – was converted on June 30, 2008.
Tampa Bay reacquired the pick as the result of a trade on November 7, 2008, that sent Matt Carle and San Jose's third-round pick in 2009 to the Philadelphia Flyers in exchange for Steve Downie, Steve Eminger and this pick.
 The Colorado Avalanche's pick went to the Columbus Blue Jackets as the result of a trade on February 26, 2008, that sent Adam Foote to Colorado for a conditional first-round pick in 2008 or 2009 and this pick (being conditional at the time of trade). The condition – Adam Foote is re-signed by Colorado prior to the 2008–09 season – was converted on June 30, 2008.
 The Atlanta Thrashers' fourth-round pick went to the Los Angeles Kings as the result of a trade on June 27, 2009, that sent two fourth-round picks (#117 and No. 120 overall) in 2009 and a seventh-round pick (#203 overall) in 2009 to Atlanta in exchange for this pick.
 The Toronto Maple Leafs' fourth-round pick went to the Nashville Predators as the result of a trade on June 21, 2008, that sent a fourth-round pick in 2008 to the San Jose Sharks in exchange for a seventh-round pick in 2008 and this pick.
San Jose previously acquired this pick as the result of a trade on June 22, 2007, that sent Vesa Toskala and Mark Bell to Toronto in exchange for a first-round pick in 2007, a second-round pick in 2007 and this pick.
 The Dallas Stars' fourth-round pick went to the Edmonton Oilers as the result of a trade on June 27, 2009, that sent Kyle Brodziak and a sixth-round pick (#161 overall) to the Minnesota Wild in exchange for a fifth-round pick (#133 overall) in 2009 and this pick.
Minnesota previously acquired this pick as the result of a trade on June 29, 2008, that sent Brian Rolston to the Tampa Bay Lightning in exchange for this pick (being conditional at the time of trade). The conditions – Ryan Malone is signed by Tampa Bay, Brian Rolston is not – have been verified on June 30, 2008 and July 1, 2008, respectively.
Tampa Bay previously acquired this pick in a trade on February 26, 2008, that sent Brad Richards and Johan Holmqvist to Dallas in exchange for Mike Smith, Jussi Jokinen, Jeff Halpern and this pick.
 The Florida Panthers' fourth-round pick went to the Phoenix Coyotes as the result of a trade on June 21, 2008, that sent a second-round pick in 2008 to Florida in exchange for a second-round pick in 2008 and this pick.
 The Columbus Blue Jackets' fourth-round pick went to the Florida Panthers as the result of a trade on June 27, 2009, that sent a third-round pick in 2010 to the Los Angeles Kings in exchange for a fifth-round pick (#138 overall) in 2009 and this pick.
Los Angeles previously acquired this pick as the result of a trade on June 27, 2009, that sent a third-round pick (#74 overall) in 2009 to the Calgary Flames in exchange for a third-round pick (#84 overall) in 2009 and this pick.
Calgary previously acquired this pick as the result of a trade on March 4, 2009, that sent Kevin Lalande to Columbus in exchange for this pick.
 The New York Rangers' fourth-round pick went to the Nashville Predators as the result of a trade on June 21, 2008, that sent a fourth-round pick in 2008 to New York in exchange for a seventh-round pick in 2008 and this pick.
 The Philadelphia Flyers' fourth-round pick went to the Boston Bruins as the result of a trade on October 13, 2008, that sent Andrew Alberts to Philadelphia in exchange for Ned Lukacevic and this pick (being conditional at the time of the trade). The condition – Philadelphia does not re-sign Alberts before his contract expires after the 2008–09 season – was converted prior to the draft day.
 The Boston Bruins' fourth-round pick went to the Minnesota Wild as the result of a trade on June 30, 2007, that sent Manny Fernandez to Boston in exchange for Petr Kalus and this pick.
 The San Jose Sharks' fourth-round pick went to the Atlanta Thrashers as the result of a trade on June 27, 2009, that sent a fourth-round pick (#95 overall) in 2009 to the Los Angeles Kings in exchange for a fourth-round pick (#120 overall) in 2009, a seventh-round pick (#203 overall) in 2009 and this pick.
Los Angeles previously acquired this pick as the result of a trade on June 21, 2008, that sent a fourth-round pick in 2008 to San Jose in exchange for a fifth-round pick in 2010 and this pick.
 The Carolina Hurricanes' fourth-round pick, owned by the Toronto Maple Leafs, was forfeited as punishment for the violation of Jonas Frogren's contract, under the NHL Collective Bargaining Agreement.
Toronto previously acquired this pick as the result of a trade on March 4, 2009, that sent Richard Petiot to the Tampa Bay Lightning in exchange for Olaf Kolzig, Andy Rogers, Jamie Heward and this pick.
Tampa Bay previously acquired this pick as the result of a trade on February 7, 2009, that sent Jussi Jokinen to Carolina in exchange for Wade Brookbank, Josef Melichar and this pick.
 The Detroit Red Wings' fourth-round pick went to the Atlanta Thrashers as the result of a trade on June 27, 2009, that sent a fourth-round pick (#95 overall) in 2009 to the Los Angeles Kings in exchange for a fourth-round pick (#117 overall) in 2009, a seventh-round pick (#203 overall) in 2009 and this pick.
Los Angeles previously acquired this pick as the result of a trade on February 26, 2008, that sent Brad Stuart to Detroit in exchange for a second-round pick in 2008 and this pick.

Round five

Notes (Round five)

 The Tampa Bay Lightning's fifth-round pick went to the Pittsburgh Penguins as the result of a trade on October 1, 2008, that sent Michal Sersen to Tampa Bay for this pick.
 The Phoenix Coyotes' fifth-round pick went to the New York Rangers as the result of a trade on February 26, 2008, that sent Marcel Hossa and Al Montoya to Phoenix in exchange for Fredrik Sjostrom, Josh Gratton, David LeNeveu and this pick (being conditional at the time of the trade). The condition – David LeNeveu is not signed by New York after the 2008–09 season – was converted on July 7, 2008 when LeNeveu was signed by the Anaheim Ducks.
 The Edmonton Oilers' fifth-round pick went to the Carolina Hurricanes as the result of a trade on March 4, 2009, that sent Patrick O'Sullivan and a second-round pick in 2009 to Edmonton in exchange for Erik Cole and this pick.
 The Minnesota Wild's fifth-round pick went to the Edmonton Oilers as the result of a trade on June 27, 2009, that sent Kyle Brodziak and a sixth-round pick (#161 overall) to Minnesota in exchange for a fourth-round pick (#99 overall) in 2009 and this pick.
 The St. Louis Blues' fifth-round pick went to the Florida Panthers as the result of a trade on June 27, 2008, that sent a third-round pick in 2010 to the Los Angeles Kings in exchange for a fifth-round pick (#107 overall) in 2009 and this pick.
Los Angeles previously acquired this pick as the result of a trade on June 4, 2008, that sent T. J. Fast to St. Louis for this pick.
 The Boston Bruins' fifth-round pick went to the Ottawa Senators as the result of a trade on June 25, 2008, that sent Brian McGrattan to the Phoenix Coyotes for this pick.
Phoenix previously acquired this pick as the result of a trade on December 6, 2007, that sent Alex Auld to Boston for Nate DiCasmirro and this pick.
 The Carolina Hurricanes' fifth-round pick went to the Tampa Bay Lightning as the result of a trade on June 27, 2008, that sent a fifth-round pick in 2010 to the Nashville Predators in exchange for this pick.
Los Angeles previously acquired this pick as the result of a trade on June 19, 2008, that sent Darcy Hordichuk and a conditional fifth-round pick in 2010 to Carolina for this pick.
 The Pittsburgh Penguins' re-acquired their fifth-round pick from the New York Rangers as the result of a trade on June 27, 2009, that sent Chad Johnson to New York in exchange for this pick.
New York previously acquired this pick as the result of a trade on July 14, 2008, that sent Ryan Hollweg to the Toronto Maple Leafs in exchange for this pick.
Toronto previously acquired this pick in a trade on February 26, 2008, that sent Hal Gill to Pittsburgh for a second-round pick in 2008 and this pick.

Round six

Notes (Round six)
 The Tampa Bay Lightning's sixth-round pick went to the Philadelphia Flyers as the result of a trade on June 30, 2008, that sent Janne Niskala to Tampa Bay in exchange for this pick.
 The Edmonton Oilers' sixth-round pick went to the Minnesota Wild as the result of a trade on June 27, 2009, that sent a fourth-round pick (#99 overall) in 2009 and a fifth-round pick (#133 overall) in 2009 to Edmonton in exchange for Kyle Brodziak and this pick.
 The Nashville Predators' sixth-round pick went to the Tampa Bay Lightning as the result of a trade on September 29, 2008, that sent Nick Tarnasky to Nashville in exchange for this pick (being conditional at the time of the trade). The condition – Tampa Bay receives the pick if Nick Tarnasky plays no more than 55 games for Nashville in the 2008–09 season – was verified on November 27, 2008 when Tarnasky was traded to the Florida Panthers.
The San Jose Sharks' sixth-round pick went to the Chicago Blackhawks as the result of a trade on June 27, 2009, that sent a fifth-round pick in 2010 to the Atlanta Thrashers in exchange for this pick.
Atlanta previously acquired this pick as the result of a trade on January 14, 2009, that sent Jason Williams to the Columbus Blue Jackets in exchange for Clay Wilson and this pick.
Columbus previously acquired this pick in a trade on January 29, 2008, that sent Jody Shelley to San Jose for this pick.
 The Chicago Blackhawks' sixth-round pick went to the Los Angeles Kings as the result of a trade on June 21, 2008, that sent a sixth-round pick in 2008 to Chicago in exchange for this pick.

Round seven

Notes (Round seven)

 The New York Islanders' seventh-round pick went to the Minnesota Wild as the result of a trade on June 26, 2009, that sent a first-round pick (#12 overall) to the New York Islanders in exchange for a first-round pick (#16 overall) in 2009, a third-round pick (#77 overall) in 2009 and this pick.
 The Phoenix Coyotes' seventh-round pick went to the Vancouver Canucks as the result of a trade on June 27, 2009, that sent Shaun Heshka to Phoenix in exchange for this pick.
 The Dallas Stars' seventh-round pick went to the San Jose Sharks as the result of a trade on June 27, 2009, that sent a sixth-round pick in 2010 to Dallas in exchange for this pick.
 The Edmonton Oilers' seventh-round pick went to the Ottawa Senators as the result of a trade on June 27, 2009, that sent a sixth-round pick in 2010 to Edmonton in exchange for this pick.
 The Florida Panthers' seventh-round pick went to the Chicago Blackhawks as the result of a trade on January 10, 2008, that sent Magnus Johansson to Florida for this pick.
 The Anaheim Ducks' seventh-round pick went to the Philadelphia Flyers as the result of a trade on June 21, 2008, that sent a seventh-round pick in 2008 to Anaheim in exchange for this pick.
 The St. Louis Blues' seventh-round pick went to the Los Angeles Kings as the result of a trade on June 21, 2008, that sent a seventh-round pick in 2008 to St. Louis in exchange for this pick.
 The Philadelphia Flyers' seventh-round pick went to the St. Louis Blues as the result of a trade on June 27, 2009, that sent a seventh-round pick in 2010 to the Nashville Predators in exchange for this pick.
Nashville previously acquired this pick as the result of a trade on June 24, 2008, that sent Janne Niskala to Philadelphia in exchange for Triston Grant and this pick.
 The Vancouver Canucks' seventh-round pick went to the Los Angeles Kings as the result of a trade on December 30, 2008, that sent Jason LaBarbera to Vancouver for this pick.
 The Pittsburgh Penguins' seventh-round pick went to the Montreal Canadiens as the result of a trade on June 27, 2009, that sent a sixth-round pick in 2010 to Pittsburgh in exchange for this pick.

Draftees based on nationality

North American draftees by state/province

See also

 2008–09 NHL season
 2009–10 NHL season
 2007–08 NHL transactions
 2008–09 NHL transactions
 List of NHL first overall draft choices
 List of NHL players

References

Notes

External links
 2009 NHL Entry Draft Order of Selection
2009 NHL Entry Draft player stats at The Internet Hockey Database

D
National Hockey League Entry Draft